Brian Nash (born June 22, 1970) is an American  basketball coach.  He is the basketball director at IMG Academy in Bradenton, Florida. 
Nash served as the head men's basketball coach at Saint Francis College in Brooklyn, New  York from 2005 to 2010.  He resigned this position on April 7, 2010 citing personal reasons.

Head coaching record

References

1970 births
Living people
American men's basketball coaches
American men's basketball players
Fairfield Stags men's basketball coaches
High school basketball coaches in the United States
Keene State Owls men's basketball players
Place of birth missing (living people)
Sacred Heart Pioneers men's basketball coaches
Seton Hall Pirates men's basketball coaches
Siena Saints men's basketball coaches
St. Bonaventure Bonnies men's basketball coaches
St. Francis Brooklyn Terriers men's basketball coaches